The Connecticut Lakes are a group of lakes in Coos County, northern New Hampshire, United States, situated along the headwaters of the Connecticut River. They are accessed via the northernmost segment of U.S. Route 3, between the village of Pittsburg and the Canada port of entry south of Chartierville, Quebec.  The lakes are located within the boundaries of Pittsburg, but are far from the town center.  Connecticut Lakes State Forest adjoins them.

There are four lakes: First, Second, Third and Fourth Connecticut Lake, numerically running south to north. The lakes decrease in size and increase in elevation, sequentially from first to fourth. The fourth lake is the source of the Connecticut River. The first three lakes can be viewed and accessed from U.S. Route 3, while the only access to the fourth lake is via the Fourth Connecticut Lake Trail, which goes in and out of Canada. All lakes are north of the 45th parallel.

Lake Francis lies to the south of the four Connecticut Lakes. It is a man-made reservoir and the last of the major lakes along the Connecticut River in northern New Hampshire.

The lakes

First Connecticut Lake

At , it is the eighth-largest lake located entirely in New Hampshire. It is the lowest in elevation and largest in surface area of the four Connecticut Lakes.

Fish species include landlocked salmon and lake trout. There are three public boat launch locations, and ice fishing is permitted from January through March. Outflow of the lake into the Connecticut River is controlled via the First Lake Dam, located near U.S. Route 3 at the southwestern shore.

Climate

According to the Köppen Climate Classification system, First Connecticut Lake has a warm-summer humid continental climate, abbreviated "Dfb" on climate maps.

A marker along the southwestern shore of the lake commemorates Luther Parker, a historical figure of the Republic of Indian Stream in the 1830s.

Second Connecticut Lake

The second lake is  higher in elevation than the first lake, and shallower.

Fish species include brook trout, landlocked salmon, and lake trout. There is one public boat launch location, and ice fishing is permitted from January through March. Outflow of the lake into the Connecticut River is controlled via the Second Lake Dam, located near U.S. Route 3 at the southwestern shore.

Third Connecticut Lake

Fish species include rainbow trout and lake trout. There is one public boat launch location, off of U.S. Route 3 along the eastern shore of the lake. Ice fishing is permitted from January through March.

Fourth Connecticut Lake

The fourth lake is immediately to the northwest of the third lake. The Fourth Connecticut Lake Trail leads hikers to the lake.

Fourth Connecticut Lake Trail
The Fourth Connecticut Lake Trail is a public trail maintained by The Nature Conservancy that criss-crosses the international border between New Hampshire and Quebec for  ending with a  loop around the Fourth Connecticut Lake. It is one of the few international trails in North America. The land surrounding the lake is owned by The Nature Conservancy.

The trail has no cell phone coverage, requires some non-technical climbing, and starts at a good elevation—hikers should be prepared, even in summer. Pets are not allowed on the trail, and no camping, hunting, or fishing is allowed.

For persons starting in the United States, passports are not needed to hike the trail, as even though parts of the trail are in Canada, the trail starts and ends on the American side of the international border. For persons starting in Canada, a passport or other border crossing document would be required in order to enter the United States at the border facility before hiking the trail.

Connecticut Lakes Natural Area

The  surrounding the lakes was set aside as a land conservation project in 2002 by the New Hampshire Fish and Game Department.  The protected area is within the towns of Clarksville and Pittsburg, up to the border with Canada.

See also

List of lakes in New Hampshire

References

External links
 Summer at First Connecticut Lake in Pittsburg, NH Aerial view in 4K via YouTube
 4th Connecticut Lake - US/Canada Border Hike via YouTube
The Crumbling, Leaking Dam at the first Connecticut Lake via YouTube

Lake groups of the United States
Lakes of Coös County, New Hampshire
Pittsburg, New Hampshire
Connecticut River
New Hampshire placenames of Native American origin